Ludovico Dondi (active 1585–1614) was an Italian painter active in Mantua. He is called il Mantovano in 1840 by Romanelli. Garollo calls him Luigi Dondi. He is known for the copies he made of Andrea Mantegna's Triumphs of Caesar.

References

16th-century births
17th-century deaths
16th-century Italian painters
Italian male painters
17th-century Italian painters
Painters from Mantua